The 2017 FC Kairat season is the 7th successive season that the club playing in the Kazakhstan Premier League, the highest tier of association football in Kazakhstan, since their promotion back to the top flight in 2009. Kairat will participate in the Kazakhstan Super Cup and the Europa League as well as the Kazakhstan Cup and Premier League.

On 21 July, Kakhaber Tskhadadze resigned as manager following Kiarat's elimination from the Europa League,. with Sergei Labodovsky being placed in temporary charge on 23 July. On 26 July, Carlos Ferrer was announced as Kairats new permanent manager, agreeing a deal until the end of the 2017 season.

Squad

Transfers

In

Out

Loans in

Loans out

Released

Friendlies

Competitions

Kazakhstan Super Cup

Kazakhstan Premier League

Results summary

Results by round

Results

League table

Kazakhstan Cup

Final

UEFA Europa League

Qualifying rounds

Squad statistics

Appearances and goals

|-
|colspan="14"|Players away from Kairat on loan:
|-
|colspan="14"|Players who left Kairat during the season:

|}

Goal scorers

Disciplinary record

References

External links
Official Website

FC Kairat seasons
Kairat